The 2000–01 season was the 121st season of competitive football in England.

Overview
Manchester United secured their third Premiership title in succession and their seventh title in just nine seasons. Liverpool became only the second English side to win the League Cup and FA Cup in the same season, also adding the UEFA Cup to make it a unique treble.

Fulham reached the Premiership as Division One champions to secure their five-season rise from Division Three. They also became the first club to have played in all four divisions of the English league since the creation of the Premiership.

Luton Town – who had been League Cup winners 13 years prior and top division members until nine years prior – and Oxford United – who had been League Cup winners 15 years earlier and top division members until 13 years prior – were relegated to Division Three.

Mid-table Division Two side Wycombe Wanderers beat all odds by reaching the FA Cup semi-final against Liverpool, beating Division One sides Millwall, Wolverhampton Wanderers, and Wimbledon, as well as Premier League side Leicester City en route to the semis. Wycombe were defeated 2–1 at Villa Park.

Successful managers
George Burley guided newly promoted Ipswich Town to fifth place in the Premiership and achieved qualification for the UEFA Cup.

Gérard Houllier won a treble of trophies with Liverpool after they triumphed in the FA Cup, League Cup and UEFA Cup.

Sir Alex Ferguson became the first manager in English football to win three successive league titles after Manchester United (only the fourth team in history to win three straight titles) topped the Premiership's final table for the third year in a row.

Alan Curbishley consolidated newly promoted Charlton Athletic in the Premiership with a ninth-place finish, their highest finish in nearly 50 years.

Jean Tigana won the Division One title with Fulham to gain promotion to the Premiership and end their 33-year exile from the top flight of English football.

Mark McGhee enjoyed success in his first season as Millwall manager by guiding them to the Division Two title.

Ronnie Moore surprised all the observers by winning a second successive promotion with Rotherham United, who were this time elevated into Division One.

Ray Graydon won his second promotion in three years with Walsall, who triumphed in the Division Two playoffs.

Micky Adams gave Brighton & Hove Albion their most successful season for years as they ended the campaign as Division Three champions.

Brian Talbot took Rushden & Diamonds, founded just nine years prior, into the Football League as Conference champions.

Successful players

Jimmy Floyd Hasselbaink, Chelsea's record signing at £15 million, topped the Premiership goalscoring charts with 23 goals.

Marcus Stewart was the Premiership's second-highest goalscorer with 19 goals for newly promoted Ipswich Town, who qualified for the UEFA Cup.

Teddy Sheringham, 35, was voted Player of the Year by both the PFA and FWA after helping Manchester United win their third successive Premiership title.

Michael Owen helped Liverpool end their six-year trophy drought after his prolific goalscoring helped them win a treble of the FA Cup, League Cup and UEFA Cup.

Steven Gerrard was voted PFA Young Player of the Year as well as winning three major trophies in a single season with Liverpool.

Young French striker Louis Saha was arguably the hottest prospect outside the Premiership after his goals helped Fulham win the Division One title to end their 33-year exile from the top flight.

Veteran striker Mark Hughes, 37, helped Blackburn Rovers return to the Premiership two years after they were relegated.

Jamie Cureton was Division Two's top goalscorer with 27 strikes for Reading.

Bobby Zamora established himself as one of the Football League's top marksmen after helping Brighton & Hove Albion win the Division Three title.

Jermain Defoe, aged 19 and on loan to AFC Bournemouth from West Ham United, scored in ten successive Division Two matches while on loan at the Dean Court side.

Events

Swede Eriksson is England's first foreign coach
With pressure building up on him following England's dismal UEFA Euro 2000 campaign, Kevin Keegan resigned as manager of the England national team just minutes after a 1–0 defeat to Germany in the opening 2002 FIFA World Cup qualifying match. The match, played 7 October 2000, was also the last played at Wembley Stadium. Howard Wilkinson and Peter Taylor each had one-match stints as caretaker manager before Sven-Göran Eriksson accepted The Football Association's offer to become the new national coach. Former Lazio coach Eriksson, 52, was the first foreigner to be appointed coach of the England national team. His first match in charge was a 3–0 win over Spain on 28 February. England would go on to win their first five matches under Eriksson, a highly promising start.

Houllier delivers three for Liverpool
Liverpool captured the 2000–01 UEFA Cup on 16 May with a 5–4 win over Alavés. The match was won in the 116th minute by golden goal, and it completed a triplet of trophies for Liverpool which ended their six-year trophy drought as well as delivering their first trophies under Houllier's management. The League Cup had already been won with a penalty shoot-out triumph over Birmingham City in the first English final at the Millennium Stadium, and the FA Cup was secured after a dramatic 2–1 win over Arsenal in which Michael Owen scored two late goals after Freddie Ljungberg had put Arsenal ahead.

Sir Alex makes history with United
Sir Alex Ferguson became the first manager in English football to win three successive League titles after Manchester United were crowned Premier League champions for the third season running. Their title was secured with 80 points and a 10-point gap between themselves and runners-up Arsenal. Most bookmakers had closed their books before the turn of the New Year and admitted that United were certain of their seventh Premier League title in the last nine years. The Red Devils''' 6–1 home league victory over Arsenal on 25 February 2001 was the turning point as Arsenal's hopes of winning the title were ended in late April 2001.

United were not the first team to win three straight league titles. Huddersfield Town, Arsenal and Liverpool had all done it before, but with managerial changes in between.

Fulham back in the big time
Fulham won the Division One title to end their 33-year absence from the top flight. The key men in this success were money-spinning chairman Mohamed Al-Fayed, enthusiastic manager Jean Tigana and free scoring striker Louis Saha.

Fulham's return to the top flight of English football came four years after they had won promotion from Division Three and been taken over by Al-Fayed in a £30 million deal. With his target of Premiership football finally achieved, al Fayed was now determined to turn Fulham into the "Manchester United of the South".

Burley clinches Manager of the Year award
Despite Sir Alex Ferguson winning a third successive Premiership title with Manchester United and Gérard Houllier's three successes in cup competitions, Ipswich Town's George Burley received the Manager of the Year award.

Burley, 45, had been at Portman Road since December 1994, when he took over from John Lyall at an Ipswich side rooted to the foot of the Premiership. He was unable to save them from the drop but quickly put together a new team in hope of getting Ipswich back in the elite of English football. They endured three successive playoff failures before winning the Division One playoff final in 2000 and ending a five-year exile from the Premiership.

Most people had tipped Ipswich to go straight back down in 2000–01, but they spent most of the season in the top five and finished fifth to claim a 2001–02 UEFA Cup place – their first foray in Europe for 20 years.

Manchester United's record breaking summer
After the end of the 2000–01 season, Sir Alex Ferguson began a summer of heavy spending. Before the season was over he had agreed an English record fee of £19 million with PSV for Ruud van Nistelrooy, the 25-year-old Dutch striker who had agreed to sign for United a year earlier, but his original move was scrapped after he suffered a serious knee injury. Then, on 12 July, Ferguson broke the English transfer fee record again. This time he brought in Argentine midfielder Juan Sebastián Verón, 26, from Lazio in a £28.1 million deal.

Basement battle for survival
At the bottom of The Football League, the battle for survival went to the last day of the season, with the bottom two sides Torquay United and Barnet playing each other at Barnet's Underhill Ground. Both teams knew that if they lost they would be relegated to the Conference. Torquay were 3–0 up at half-time, but Barnet, playing with five up front for periods of the second half, scored twice to keep the tension levels high until the end of the match. It finished 3–2 to Torquay and Barnet lost their league place.

Honours

England national team

League tables

FA Premier League

Manchester United became the fourth team in history to win the English league title three seasons in a row; in one of the least eventful title races in Premier League history, they went top after seven games and never relinquished their lead, nor looked to be in any danger of doing so. Arsenal likewise never dropped below second place after mid-October, leaving the real drama as who being who would take third spot, and thereby the final Champions League place.

Ultimately, Liverpool finished third and won both domestic cup competitions as well as the UEFA Cup, becoming the first-ever club to win this treble of cups. Leeds United finished fourth, being left to rue a terrible first half of the season that saw them look in danger of being sucked into the relegation fight, but somewhat made up for this with much better form after Christmas and more significantly, a run to the semi-finals of the Champions League. 

The biggest surprise of the season came with Ipswich Town, who were newly promoted to the Premiership after five years away and most people's favourites for the drop. Ipswich surprised all the observers by challenging for a place in the top-three and eventually winding up in fifth place, enough to merit UEFA Cup qualification. It was the Suffolk club's highest league finish since 1982. Chelsea took sixth place and thereby the final UEFA Cup spot, as despite the controversial early-season sacking of Gianluca Vialli, the most successful manager in the club's history at that point, they eventually regrouped under new manager Claudio Ranieri.

Newly promoted Charlton Athletic finished an impressive ninth, while Leicester City started the season as unlikely title contenders, but lost nine of their final ten Premiership matches to finish 13th.

Bradford City were the first team to be relegated, having won just five Premiership games all season in their second season after promotion. Joining them were newly promoted Manchester City and Coventry City, whose luck finally ran out after 34 years in the top flight.

Leading goalscorer: Jimmy Floyd Hasselbaink (Chelsea) –  23

Football League First Division

Under the management of Jean Tigana, but with only two changes to the previous season's first team, Fulham won the division easily. Blackburn Rovers managed to edge close rivals Bolton Wanderers to the automatic promotion spot, though their rivalry would continue the following season as Bolton defeated Preston North End (another set of close rivals) in the playoffs.

Burnley's seventh-place finish put them just one place short of the playoffs and the chance of ending their 25-year absence from the top flight. Wimbledon finished eighth in their first season outside the top flight for 15 years. Watford faltered to finish ninth after a strong start to the season suggested that they would win promotion back to the Premier League, prompting the resignation of Graham Taylor as manager and the appointment of Gianluca Vialli in his place.

Tranmere's recent cup successes failed to translate into league form, and they finished bottom, just behind Queens Park Rangers, who fell into the third tier for the first time since the 1960s. An unlikely series of results in the final few weeks sent Huddersfield down to Division Two, when they had looked safe at the start of April. Narrowly avoiding relegation were Crystal Palace, whose dramatic last day victory over Stockport ensured survival for a club who spent the previous two seasons struggling with a financial crisis.

Leading goalscorer: Louis Saha (Fulham) – 27

Football League Second Division

Millwall, who had failed to impress since relegation from the First Division in 1996, finally secured promotion as divisional champions. Making perhaps bigger headlines were unfashionable Rotherham United, who instead of struggling as the pundits predicted, took the second automatic promotion spot, pushing Millwall perilously close for the title. Walsall recovered from the previous year's last-day relegation and won the playoffs.

Oxford finished bottom of the table by some distance, never looking as if they would survive and setting a number of unwanted records for the division. Swansea – who had beaten Rotherham to the Division Three title the previous season – proved almost as bad as Oxford, with their survival hopes being little better. Much was expected of Luton following massive pre-season overhauls both on and off the pitch; unfortunately their season ended in crushing disappointment, and relegation. Bristol Rovers occupied the final relegation spot, entering the League's bottom tier for the first time in their history. Swindon narrowly avoided a second successive relegation.

Leading goalscorer: Jamie Cureton (Reading) and Neil Harris (Millwall), 27

Football League Third Division

After their financial nightmares and near-relegations of the previous years, Brighton finally started making serious progress, as they won the title. Chesterfield would have taken the runners-up spot; however, financial irregularities resulted in a nine-point deduction, handing second place to Cardiff instead, though Chesterfield still took the final automatic promotion spot. Blackpool sneaked into the playoffs near the end of the season, then proceeded to win them, ensuring that their spell in Division Three was a short one.

A number of teams were threatened with relegation during the course of the season. However, in the end, Barnet – who moved long-serving manager John Still upstairs to make way for the higher-profile appointment of Tony Cottee early in the season – suffered a stunning collapse after a bright start, leading to a "winner takes all, loser stands small" match with Torquay on the final day of the season. Torquay won the match and ensured League survival, while Barnet returned to the Conference after a decade in the league. Carlisle endured a third successive relegation battle and were successful once again.

Leading goalscorer: Bobby Zamora (Brighton & Hove Albion), 28

Note: Cardiff City left administration and made arrangements before promotion as runner up and Chesterfield deducted 9 points for beginning financial irregularities.

 Diary of the season 
 2 July 2000: The News of the World reports that Kevin Keegan has resigned as England national coach, but the reports are swiftly denied. Meanwhile, Terry Venables (who was in charge from 1994 to 1996) insists that he is not interested in becoming national coach if Keegan departs.
 3 July 2000: Arsenal sign France midfielder Robert Pires from Marseille for £6 million.
 5 July 2000: Newcastle United sign striker Carl Cort from Wimbledon for £7 million.
 10 July 2000: Birmingham City pay a club record £2.25 million for Fulham striker Geoff Horsfield as they prepare to make it third time lucky after two successive playoff failures in Division One.
 14 July 2000: Fulham prepare for their Division One title challenge under Jean Tigana with a £2 million move for Everton and Scotland midfielder John Collins.
 17 July 2000: Former England midfielder Paul Gascoigne, 33, signs for Everton on a free transfer from Middlesbrough.
 18 July 2000: Everton forward Nick Barmby moves to neighbours Liverpool for £6 million.
 20 July 2000: Charlton Athletic, newly promoted to the Premier League, pay a club record £4 million for Claus Jensen from Bolton Wanderers.
 21 July 2000: Leeds United pay £6 million for Celtic and Australia striker Mark Viduka.
 24 July 2000: Leicester City pay £5 million for Wolverhampton Wanderers striker Ade Akinbiyi.
 25 July 2000: Sunderland pay £3.5 million for Argentina defender Julio Arca from Argentinos Juniors.
 26 July 2000: West Bromwich Albion, looking to improve on last season's 21st-place finish in Division One, sign striker Jason Roberts from Bristol Rovers for £2 million.
 28 July 2000: Arsenal sell Emmanuel Petit to Barcelona for £5 million, along with Marc Overmars for £25 million.
 30 July 2000: Aston Villa sign David Ginola from Tottenham Hotspur for £3 million.
 1 August 2000: After a year at Coventry City, Robbie Keane joins Inter Milan for £13 million.
 7 August 2000: Middlesbrough sign Croatian striker Alen Bokšić from Lazio for £2.5 million.
 13 August 2000: Chelsea defeat Manchester United to win the Charity Shield in the last-ever club game at Wembley Stadium before it is closed for reconstruction.
 17 August 2000: Everton purchase Duncan Ferguson back from Newcastle United for £3.75 million, and Coventry City play a club record £6.5 million for Norwich City winger Craig Bellamy.
 18 August 2000: Liverpool sell defender Dominic Matteo to Leeds United for £4.75 million.
 19 August 2000: Opening day drama in the Premier League sees newly promoted Charlton Athletic and Manchester City clash at The Valley, with the hosts winning 4–0. Jimmy Floyd Hasselbaink scores a penalty on his league debut for Chelsea as they defeat West Ham United 4–2 at Stamford Bridge.
 23 August 2000: Paulo Wanchope scores a hat-trick for Manchester City as they beat Sunderland 4–2 at Maine Road.
 25 August 2000: Liverpool pay Middlesbrough £5.5 million for Christian Ziege.
 31 August 2000: The first month of the league season draws to a close with Arsenal leading the Premier League and the top five being completed by Leeds United, Newcastle United, Coventry City and Manchester United. The three relegation places are occupied by West Ham United, Aston Villa and Southampton.
 5 September 2000: Defending champions and title favourites Manchester United beat Bradford City 6–0 at Old Trafford.
 10 September 2000 : Luc Nilis, Aston Villa's 33-year-old Belgian striker, suffers a badly broken leg in his third fixture for the club and the injury is reported as likely to end his career.
 12 September 2000: Gianluca Vialli is sacked after two-and-a-half years in charge of Chelsea, during which time he won the FA Cup, League Cup, UEFA Cup Winners' Cup, Charity Shield and UEFA Super Cup.
 15 September 2000: Chelsea name Italian Claudio Ranieri as their new manager.
 30 September 2000: Rumours are circulating that Aston Villa are about to purchase back Dwight Yorke from Manchester United, two years after he left them in a £12.6 million deal. Meanwhile, Yorke's current club are top of the Premier League as September draws to a close, facing stiff competition from surprise title contenders Leicester City along with Arsenal, Liverpool and newly promoted Charlton Athletic. Bradford City, Derby County and West Ham United prop up the table. In Division One, Fulham lead the way after winning their opening four matches of the season. Watford are looking good bets for an immediate return to the Premier League as they stand second with three wins and a draw from their first four games. Bolton Wanderers, Blackburn Rovers, Birmingham City and newly promoted Preston North End complete the top six. Sheffield Wednesday's hopes of an immediate return to the Premier League are fading fast as they prop up Division One and look in real danger of a second successive relegation. Huddersfield Town, who spent last season challenging for promotion, now find themselves fighting against relegation in 22nd place.
 1 October 2000 – Leicester City go top of the Premier League at the expense of Manchester United. It is the first time since the 1963–64 season that Leicester have been top of the English league.
 7 October 2000: After 77 years, Wembley Stadium closes its doors for the last time in order to allow a complete reconstruction which should be finished in 2003. The final game at the old stadium is England's first qualifying match for the 2002 FIFA World Cup. They lost 1–0 to Germany and manager Kevin Keegan resigns after 18 months at the helm.
 14 October 2000: Leicester City surrender their lead of the Premier League with a 3–0 home defeat by Manchester United, who replace them at the top of the table.
 21 October 2000: Jimmy Floyd Hasselbaink scores four goals as Chelsea beat Coventry City 6–1 in the league at Stamford Bridge.
 28 October 2000: Arsenal beat Manchester City 5–0 in the league at Highbury. Teddy Sheringham scores a hat-trick for Manchester United as a 5–0 win over Southampton keeps them top of the Premier League.
 30 October 2000: Lazio's Swedish coach Sven-Göran Eriksson accepts The Football Association's offer to take charge of the England team from next summer. It is widely assumed that either Howard Wilkinson or Peter Taylor, both of whom have taken caretaker charge since the resignation of Kevin Keegan, will act as interim manager until then, although the FA hold off any making any announcements just yet.
 31 October 2000: October draws to a close with Manchester United still top of the Premier League, though now only on goal difference ahead of Arsenal. Leicester City's surprise title challenge is being joined by a Liverpool side looking to end their 11-year wait for the league title, as well as a newly promoted Ipswich Town who were among most people's pre-season favourites for relegation. Derby County, still without a win after 11 matches, prop up the table, joined in the bottom three by Bradford City and Southampton. Watford have now leapfrogged Fulham by a single point at the top of Division One, while the playoff zone is occupied by Birmingham City, Preston North End, West Bromwich Albion and Bolton Wanderers. Burnley, newly promoted this season, are just one point and one place outside the playoff zone and looking like contenders for a second successive promotion.
 4 November 2000: Mark Viduka scores all four goals for Leeds United as they beat Liverpool 4–3 in the Premier League at Elland Road.
 18 November 2000: The first Manchester derby in five seasons sees United beat City 1–0 at Maine Road with an early goal from David Beckham.
 23 November 2000: Leeds United break the English transfer fee record by paying £18 million for West Ham United centre-back Rio Ferdinand, while Chelsea's £12 million sale of Tore André Flo to Rangers breaks the Scottish record.
 25 November 2000: Les Ferdinand scores a hat-trick as Tottenham Hotspur defeat Leicester City 3–0 in the league at White Hart Lane.
 30 November 2000: Manchester United finish November as Premier League leaders, with an eight-point margin over Arsenal who have a game in hand. The surprise challenge of Ipswich Town and Leicester City continues, as does the challenge of Liverpool. Bradford City and Derby County continue to prop up the top flight, joined in the drop zone by Middlesbrough. Fulham have now regained their lead of Division One and are nine points ahead of Watford. Burnley had leapfrogged Preston North End into the playoff zone, which is still occupied by Birmingham City, West Bromwich Albion and Bolton Wanderers.
 1 December 2000: Middlesbrough withdraw an offer to Terry Venables for him to become the club's first-team coach.
 6 December 2000: Five days after withdrawing their offer for him to become first-team coach, Middlesbrough unveil Terry Venables as first-team coach to work alongside manager Bryan Robson, who had been his assistant with the England team from 1994 to 1996.
 8 December 2000: Martin O'Neill buys his former Leicester City player Neil Lennon for Celtic in a £5.75 million deal.

Two Chelsea hooligans are jailed for planning violence at matches after being exposed by an undercover journalist in a BBC documentary. Jason Marriner, 33, of Feltham, is sentenced to six years in prison, and 36-year-old Andrew Frain of Reading is sentenced to seven years behind bars. Both are banned from attending all football matches in England and Wales for the next 20 years.

 9 December 2000: Midfielder Ray Parlour scores a hat-trick as Arsenal beat Newcastle United 5–0 at Highbury, while Charlton Athletic hold Manchester United to a 3–3 draw at The Valley.
 14 December 2000: West Ham United fail in a £10 million bid for Coventry City striker Robbie Keane. Had the deal been completed, Keane would have been West Ham's most expensive signing ever.
 16 December 2000: Manchester United suffer their first home defeat in the Premier League for two years when a Danny Murphy goal gives Liverpool a 1–0 win at Old Trafford.
 18 December 2000: Dave Bassett resigns as manager of Barnsley, who are battling relegation in Division One just seven months after narrowly missing out on promotion to the Premier League.
 21 December 2000 – Alan Sugar, chairman of Tottenham Hotspur since 1991, announces his decision to sell the club. Meanwhile, Division One leaders Fulham are rumoured to be making an £8 million bid to Barcelona for former Arsenal midfielder Emmanuel Petit.
 22 December 2000: Recent calls for standing accommodation to be relegalised at Premier League grounds are blasted by relatives of some the 96 people killed in the Hillsborough disaster, the 1989 tragedy which led to standing accommodation being banned from all top division grounds by 1994.
 31 December 2000: The year 2000 draws to a close with Manchester United now eight points ahead of Arsenal at the top of the Premier League, while Ipswich Town and Leicester City's surprise title challenge – which is becoming more distant – is now being joined by a threat from vastly improving Sunderland. Leeds United, who were among the pre-season title favourites, now occupy a disappointing 14th place. Bradford City, meanwhile, occupy bottom place with a mere two wins and 12 points from their first 20 matches. Middlesbrough remain in the drop zone, into which Manchester City have sunk following an upturn in fortunes for Derby County. Fulham are still top of Division One, but Watford have crashed from second to eighth over the last month, with second place now occupied by Bolton Wanderers. The playoff zone is occupied by Blackburn Rovers, Birmingham City, West Bromwich Albion and a resurgent Nottingham Forest.
 4 January 2001: Chris Coleman, Fulham captain, shatters his leg in a car crash. The Welsh defender who was widely touted as the best defender outside the Premier League breaks both legs in a combined 24 places, his right ankle and tears his cruciate ligament on his right knee. After a tough fightback which earned him a re-call to the Welsh squad and a few Fulham reserve matches, Coleman realised he would never get back to his best and retired on 3 October 2002.
 9 January 2001: Sven-Göran Eriksson resigns as Lazio manager and frees himself to take charge of the England team six months earlier than planned.
 24 January 2001: Luc Nilis announces his retirement from playing, four months after suffering a badly broken leg in a Premier League fixture for Aston Villa.
 31 January 2001: January draws to a close with Manchester United now 15 points ahead of Arsenal at the top of the Premier League, with Sunderland, Liverpool and Ipswich Town among the even more distant title challengers, while Leicester City have now dipped to eighth place and are now focused on pushing for a top-six finish as well as a good run in the FA Cup. Chelsea are starting to muscle in on the top five after being 14th a month ago. Bradford continue to prop up the Premier League and Manchester City remain in the bottom three, although Middlesbrough have climbed clear of the drop zone at the expense of Coventry City. Fulham and Bolton Wanderers continue to lead the way in Division One. Blackburn Rovers, West Bromwich Albion and Birmingham City remain in the playoff zone, joined by a rejuvenated Watford.
 25 February 2001: After a 1–1 draw in open play at the Millennium Stadium, Liverpool become the first English team to win a major trophy on penalties after they achieved a shoot-out victory over Birmingham City in the League Cup final – their sixth success in the competition. On the same day, Manchester United open up a 16-point lead over their nearest title challengers Arsenal by crushing them 6–1 at Old Trafford. The rest of the strong performing Premier League clubs are now concentrating on qualifying for Europe rather than winning the league. These clubs include Ipswich Town, Sunderland, Liverpool, Leeds United, Charlton Athletic and Chelsea. At the other end of the table, Bradford City sink further towards inevitable relegation after losing all their games this month, while Manchester City and Coventry City continue to prop up the rest of the table.
 27 February 2001: Stan Cullis, who took charge of the great post-war Wolverhampton Wanderers side that won three league titles and two FA Cups, dies in Worcestershire at the age of 85.
 28 February 2001: Fulham continue to lead the way in Division One with a 12-point lead over nearest rivals Bolton Wanderers. The playoff zone remains unchanged from the end of last month.
 24 March 2001: Gurnam Singh, a 46-year-old Sikh Asian football referee from Wolverhampton, accuses the Premier League and Football League of racial discrimination and unfair dismissal after a senior Football Association official claimed, "[W]e don't want people like him in the Premier League."
 28 March 2001: England field a record of seven black players in Sven Eriksson's first game in charge as they beat Spain 3–0 in a World Cup qualifier at Villa Park.
 29 March 2001: Glenn Hoddle resigns as Southampton manager to take over at Tottenham Hotspur after the dismissal of George Graham, who had breached the terms of his contract.
 31 March 2001: Former Arsenal and England midfielder David Rocastle dies of cancer aged 33. On the same day, the final fixtures of the month see Manchester United 13 points ahead of Arsenal at the top of the Premier League with seven games to go, while the race for the final Champions League place and the three UEFA Cup places is wide open with Leeds United, Liverpool, Ipswich Town, Sunderland, Chelsea, Leicester City, Southampton, Charlton Athletic and Aston Villa all in contention. Bradford City's relegation is looking even more inevitable as they remain bottom with just three wins and 18 points from 30 games. Manchester City and Coventry City remain in the drop zone as well, though with a far greater chance than Bradford City of turning up the heat on the likes of Middlesbrough, Derby County, West Ham United and Everton. Fulham now look all set for automatic promotion with a 17-point lead over nearest rivals Bolton Wanderers at the top of Division One. Preston North End have edged Watford out of the playoff zone, which is otherwise unchanged from last month.
 14 April 2001: Manchester United clinch their seventh Premiership title in nine seasons with a 4–2 win over relegation-threatened Coventry City. Fulham seal promotion to the Premier League after 33 years outside the top flight, but their success is soured with the death of 87-year-old former manager Alec Stock.
 30 April 2001: April draws to a close with Manchester United's league title firmly under wraps, and the remaining top-half clubs now concentrating on the European places. Arsenal and Leeds United occupy the next two places that carry Champions League qualification, while the UEFA Cup places are occupied by Ipswich Town, Liverpool and Chelsea. However, Sunderland, Aston Villa, Charlton Athletic and Newcastle United are still turning up the heat on them. At the other end of the table, Bradford City's inevitable relegation has been confirmed, while Coventry City and Manchester City need to win both of their remaining matches to stand any chance of survival, which would be at the expense of two teams out of Derby County, Middlesbrough and West Ham United. Fulham, promoted as Division One champions, now have 101 points with one match to play, while Blackburn Rovers and Bolton Wanderers are contending for second place. Preston North End, Birmingham City and West Bromwich Albion have sealed playoff places.
 5 May 2001: Coventry City lost 3–2 at Aston Villa and are relegated from the Premiership after 34 years in the top flight.
 8 May 2001: Leeds United's remarkable run in the UEFA Champions League is ended with a 3–0 defeat in the semi-final 2nd leg against Valencia.
 12 May 2001: Liverpool clinch the FA Cup by defeating Arsenal 2–1 thanks to a late double from Michael Owen. It is their sixth FA Cup triumph to date and their first since 1992.
 16 May 2001: Liverpool yield their third trophy of the season by defeating Spanish side Alavés 5–4 in the UEFA Cup final. It is the third time they have won the trophy and the second time they have won three major trophies in one season, the first being 1984.
 19 May 2001: The Premiership season ends with champions Manchester United, runners-up Arsenal and third-placed Liverpool qualifying for the UEFA Champions League, with the UEFA Cup places going to Leeds United, Ipswich Town and Chelsea. The relegated teams are Manchester City, Coventry City and Bradford City. Southampton end 103 years of league action at The Dell with a 3–2 home win over Arsenal, in which club legend Matt Le Tissier scores the winning goal.
 21 May 2001: Leeds United purchase Robbie Keane from Inter Milan for £12 million. Chelsea purchase William Gallas from Marseille for £6.2 million.
 24 May 2001: Seven months after quitting as England manager, Kevin Keegan makes a return to football when he is named as Joe Royle's successor at Manchester City on a three-year contract.
 26 May 2001: A week after the last competitive game at The Dell, Southampton's old stadium finally hosts its last ever match when Brighton & Hove Albion – Southampton's first opponents there in 1898 – visit the stadium for a friendly against the Saints, who win 1–0 with Uwe Rosler scoring the last ever goal at the stadium.
 28 May 2001: Bolton Wanderers defeat Preston North End 3–0 in the Division One playoff final to join champions Fulham and runners-up Blackburn Rovers in the Premiership.
 5 June 2001: Bryan Robson resigns after seven years as manager of Middlesbrough.
 12 June 2001: One week after the resignation of Bryan Robson as manager, Terry Venables steps down as Middlesbrough's first-team coach. The new Middlesbrough manager is Steve McClaren, formerly assistant manager of Manchester United.
 18 June 2001: Youth team coach Glenn Roeder is named as West Ham United's new manager.

European qualifiers

UEFA Champions League

Group phase
Manchester United
Arsenal

Qualifying round
Liverpool

UEFA Cup
Leeds United
Ipswich Town
Chelsea

Promoted teamsFrom Division One to the Premier League:Fulham
Blackburn Rovers
Bolton WanderersFrom Division Two to Division One:Millwall
Rotherham United
WalsallFrom Division Three to Division Two:Brighton & Hove Albion
Cardiff City
Chesterfield
BlackpoolFrom The Football Conference to Division Three:Rushden & Diamonds

Relegated teamsFrom the Premier League to Division One:Manchester City
Coventry City
Bradford CityFrom Division One to Division Two:Huddersfield Town
Queens Park Rangers
Tranmere RoversFrom Division Two to Division Three:Bristol Rovers
Luton Town
Swansea City
Oxford UnitedFrom Division Three to The Football Conference:''
Barnet

Major Transfer deals

2000
3 July – Robert Pires from Marseille to Arsenal, £6m
3 July – Carlo Cudicini from Castel di Sangro to Chelsea
17 July – Paul Gascoigne from Middlesbrough to Everton, free
18 July – Nick Barmby from Everton to Liverpool, £6m
21 July – Mark Viduka from Celtic to Leeds United, £6m
25 July – Julio Arca from Argentinos Juniors to Sunderland, £3.5m
28 July – Alpay Özalan from Fenerbahçe to Aston Villa, £5.6m
17 August – Craig Bellamy from Norwich City to Coventry City, £6.5m
25 August – Christian Ziege from Middlesbrough to Liverpool, £5.5m
26 August – Sylvain Wiltord from Bordeaux to Arsenal, £13m
20 September – Ugo Ehiogu from Aston Villa to Middlesbrough, £8m
26 October – Rio Ferdinand from West Ham United to Leeds United, £18m
7 December – Igor Bišćan from Dinamo Zagreb to Liverpool, £5.5m
29 December – Jesper Grønkjær from Ajax to Chelsea, £7.8m

2001
13 January – Juan Pablo Ángel from River Plate to Aston Villa, £9.5m
16 January – Edu from Corinthians to Arsenal, £6m
21 May – Robbie Keane from Inter Milan to Leeds United, £12m
14 June – Frank Lampard from West Ham United to Chelsea, £11m
17 June – Corrado Grabbi from Ternana to Blackburn Rovers, £6.75m

Famous debutants
 After failing to break into the Tottenham Hotspur side, Peter Crouch, 19, makes his league debut for new club Queens Park Rangers in a goalless draw with Birmingham City on the opening day of the season.
 The same weekend sees future England teammate Joleon Lescott, play for Wolverhampton Wanderers in their draw with Sheffield Wednesday shortly before his 18th birthday.
 Seventeen-year-old Jermain Defoe scores the only goal of the game as West Ham United win 1–0 at Walsall in the League Cup in August 2000.

Retirements

3 August 2000: Pierluigi Casiraghi, 31-year-old Italian striker, retires nearly two years after he broke his leg in a Premier League match for Chelsea and failed to make a full recovery.

28 September 2000: Steve Bould, 37-year-old central defender, retires after just over a year at Sunderland, having joined them after 11 years at Arsenal where he formed part of one of the most successful defence line-ups of modern times.

8 November 2000: Robbie Earle, 35-year-old Wimbledon and Jamaica midfielder, retires due to a stomach injury.

24 January 2001: Luc Nilis, 33-year-old Belgian striker, retires on medical advice four months after suffering a badly broken leg while playing for Aston Villa against Ipswich Town.

4 May 2001: Dave Watson, 39-year-old central defender, finally retires from playing after 15 years with Everton after accepting an offer to manage Tranmere Rovers.

9 May 2001: Tony Cottee, 35-year-old striker, retires after a brief spell at Millwall during their Division Two promotion run-in.

4 July 2001: Gary Pallister, 36-year-old central defender, retires after 17 years in professional football after three years back at Middlesbrough, who gave him his Football League break when he began his first spell with them in 1984. His biggest successes came at Manchester United between 1989 and 1998, where he won four league titles, three FA Cups, a Football League Cup and the European Cup Winners' Cup. He was also capped 22 times by England between 1988 and 1996.

Deaths
 8 July 2000: Cliff Sear, 63, took much of the credit for helping develop the career of Ian Rush from his work with the Chester youth set-up in the late 1970s. His 19-year association with Chester (1968–87) also included a spells as manager and player. The former Welsh international had earlier played for Manchester City and later worked for Wrexham.
 29 July 2000: Benny Fenton, 81, played 409 league games at wing-half between 1937 and 1958 for West Ham United, Millwall, Charlton Athletic and Colchester United. He served Colchester United for eight years as manager, before a year-long spell in charge of Orient before returning to Millwall as manager in 1966 and remaining in charge of the club for eight years until 1974.
 18 August 2000: Maurice Evans, 63, died of a heart attack. He had managed Reading to the Fourth Division championship in 1979 and most famously took charge of Oxford United during their three-year spell in the top flight (1985–88). Guided them to League Cup glory in 1986. Was sacked in March 1988 as they were heading for relegation to the Second Division, but was later employed at the club as caretaker manager (during the autumn of 1993) and then as Director of Football.
 29 August 2000: Willie Maddren, 49, played 293 league games in defence for his only club, Middlesbrough, between 1969 and 1977 before a knee injury cut his playing career short at the age of 26. He officially retired as a player in 1979, returning to the Teesside club as physiotherapist in 1982 before being promoted to the manager's seat in March 1984. Although his time as manager at the club was difficult due to the club's financial difficulties and a loss in form which pushed them towards relegation to the Third Division in 1986 (costing him his job), he built a significant part of the side which would win two successive promotions under his successor Bruce Rioch. Maddren then enjoyed success with his own sports trophy business before being diagnosed with motor neuron disease in 1995, the illness claiming his life after five years.
 23 October 2000: Doug Millward, 69, played 143 league games as a forward for Ipswich Town under Alf Ramsey between 1955 and 1963, scoring 35 goals and being part of their title winning team in 1962. Became manager of St Mirren in Scotland in 1965 before furthering his career to the USA a year later and staying there until his death.
 1 November 2000: George Armstrong, 56, died of a stroke at Arsenal's training ground where he had been coaching the club's reserve side. He had been a key player in their 1971 double triumph.
 10 November 2000: Bob Matthewson, 70, played three league games for Bolton Wanderers in the early postwar years before moving into refereeing. He refereed many top matches, including the 1974 FA Charity Shield (in which he sent off Kevin Keegan and Billy Bremner for fighting) and the 1977 FA Cup Final.
 7 February 2001: Marc North, 34, who died of cancer, started his career as a striker for Luton Town, making 18 First Division appearances in the mid-1980s and scoring three goals. He signed for Grimsby Town in 1987 and spent two years at Blundell Park, memorably scoring twice as a substitute in a surprise FA Cup tie victory over Middlesbrough as well as scoring 17 goals in 67 league games before his move to Leicester City in 1989. He was transferred back to Grimsby in 1991 but left a year later after just one league appearance, with back injuries taking their toll and ending his senior career at the age of 26, although he continued to play at non-league level until 1999.
 28 February 2001: Stan Cullis, 85, manager of Wolverhampton Wanderers from 1947 to 1964, having previously been on the club's playing staff. Won three league championships and two FA Cups. Was Birmingham City manager from 1965 until 1970. During the early 1990s redevelopment of the Molineux, a new stand was named in honour of Stan Cullis.
 30 March 2001: George Mutch, 88, Aberdeen born inside-forward, signed for Manchester United in 1934 and collected a Second Division title medal in 1936, managing 46 goals in 112 league games for the club before his transfer to Preston North End in 1937. He scored the last-minute winning penalty for the Deepdale side in their 1938 FA Cup final triumph, but his chances of further success were sabotaged by the outbreak of World War II a year later. He continued his career after the war with Bury and finally Southport. His solitary cap for Scotland came in 1938.
 31 March 2001: David Rocastle, 33, who won two league championships and one League Cup with Arsenal (where he played from 1983 until 1992), died of cancer. He played 14 times for England without scoring, but was never on the losing side. He later played for Leeds United, Manchester City, Chelsea, Norwich City, Hull City and Malaysian side Sabah before retiring in 1999. His nine-year-old son Ryan was Arsenal's mascot at the FA Cup final just six weeks after Rocastle senior's death.
 8 April 2001: Dennis Roberts, 83, played 306 league games at centre-half for Bristol City between 1938 and 1954.
 9 June 2001: Ronnie Allen, 72, had an illustrious career as a forward for Port Vale, West Bromwich Albion and Crystal Palace between 1946 and 1965, scoring 276 goals (208 of them for Albion). He was capped five times by England during the 1950s, scoring twice, and collected an FA Cup winner's medal in 1954 with Albion. He moved into management with Wolverhampton Wanderers in 1966, guiding the club to promotion a year later and later taking charge of Atletico Bilbao, Sporting Lisbon, Walsall, West Bromwich Albion (twice), and Greek side Panathinaikos. His final contribution to management came in 1981–82 with his second spell in charge of Albion, where they reached the semi-finals of both domestic cups, but narrowly avoided relegation from the top flight a year after finishing fourth under his predecessor Ron Atkinson. He remained at Albion on the coaching and scouting staff until 1996, and his death came after a struggle with Alzheimer's disease.
 30 June 2001: Joe Fagan, 80, was a long-serving coach at Liverpool when he succeeded Bob Paisley as manager in 1983. In his first season they won a unique treble of the league championship, League Cup and European Cup, but his last season ended trophyless after they lost 1–0 to Juventus in the European Cup final at Heysel – the infamous game at which the Heysel Stadium disaster claimed the lives of 39 spectators.

References